Paramignya citrifolia is a sweet-scented species of flowering plant. It is a spiny scandent shrub found in evergreen forests of tropical Asia. It grows along hill streams. In Bangladesh, it is found in the forests of Bandarban, Chattogram, Cox's Bazar, Khagrachari and Rangamati districts.

Distribution
Paramignya citrifolia is native to Bangladesh and Myanmar.

References

Aurantioideae
Flora of Bangladesh
Flora of Myanmar